Domestic violence hotlines provide emergency support and referral services over the phone those in volatile relationships. Hotlines are generally dedicated to women escaping abusive relationships and provide referral to women's shelters.

Domestic violence hotlines are generally available at all times during the day, however, problems with busy lines or  disconnections due to lack of funding sometimes limit their usefulness. Additionally, battered gay men report that hotline workers will sometimes not provide them with services or will refer them to the batterers' line. Nonetheless, scholars assume that hotlines reduce frequency of domestic violence.

Australia

Canada

China

Japan

New Zealand

Pakistan

South Africa

Taiwan

United Kingdom

United States

References

Domestic violence by country